Cullins-Baker House is a historic plantation house located near Smalls Crossroads, Chowan County, North Carolina. It was built in the late 1830s, and is a two-story, three-bay, transitional Federal / Greek Revival-style frame dwelling.  It has a two-story rear ell and center-hall plan.

It was listed on the National Register of Historic Places in 1982.

References

Plantation houses in North Carolina
Houses on the National Register of Historic Places in North Carolina
Federal architecture in North Carolina
Greek Revival houses in North Carolina
Houses completed in 1838
Houses in Chowan County, North Carolina
National Register of Historic Places in Chowan County, North Carolina